Neotropical bellbird (or simply bellbird) is the common name given to passerine birds of the genus Procnias, found in the Neotropics. They are members of the cotinga family. They are all restricted to tropical or subtropical humid forested regions, often in low mountains or foothills. As indicated by their common name, they all have extremely loud calls that are reminiscent of a metal bell being rung.

Three of the four species are restricted to South America, while the last, the three-wattled bellbird, is restricted to southern Central America.

They are strongly sexually dimorphic. Males have an at least partially white plumage, and facial wattles or bare facial skin. Females lack the wattles/bare facial skin, and are overall olive with yellowish streaks below.

Taxonomy
The genus Procnias  was introduced in 1811 by the German zoologist Johann Karl Wilhelm Illiger. The name comes from Greek mythology, Procne was an Athenian princess who was metamorphosed into a swallow. The type species was designated as the bearded bellbird by George Gray in 1840.

The genus contains four species.

References

Further reading

 Snow, D.W. (1982). The Cotingas: Bellbirds, Umbrella birds and their allies. British Museum Press.